Tyler Sean Labine (born April 29, 1978) is a Canadian-American actor. He is best known for starring in the television series Breaker High, Invasion, Reaper, Deadbeat and as Dr. Iggy Frome, head of psychiatry, in the NBC medical drama New Amsterdam, and the film Tucker & Dale vs Evil.

Life and career

Labine was born in Brampton, Ontario, Canada, but grew up in Maple Ridge, British Columbia. He is the brother of actors Kyle Labine and Cameron Labine. He played the role of Dave Groves in Invasion, and Bert "Sock" Wysocki in Reaper, and Dale in the comedy-horror film Tucker & Dale vs Evil. He played the lead character in the 2010 Fox comedy series Sons of Tucson, but the show was cancelled after 4 episodes (the remaining 9 episodes that were shot aired that summer).

He also played Jimmy Mortimor Farrell on YTV's Breaker High from 1997 to 1998. In 2011, he co-starred in the CBS comedy Mad Love as Larry Munsch. He starred in the NBC comedy series Animal Practice alongside Justin Kirk and Bobby Lee, which premiered in September 2012. He also starred in the Hulu show Deadbeat. In 2017, he played Sherlock Hobbs in the second season of Dirk Gently's Holistic Detective Agency.

From 2018 to 2023, he was part of the main cast of New Amsterdam where he played Head of Psychiatry, Dr. Iggy Frome.

He is a fan of the Edmonton Oilers.

Filmography

Film

Television

Video games

References

External links

Living people
Male actors from Ontario
Canadian male film actors
Canadian male television actors
Canadian male voice actors
People from Brampton
20th-century Canadian male actors
21st-century Canadian male actors
1978 births